UNTV, formally known as UNTV News and Rescue and UNTV Public Service, is the flagship Philippine television network of the Progressive Broadcasting Corporation (known on air as UNTV-PBC), together with Breakthrough and Milestones Productions International (known on air as UNTV-BMPI), the network's content provider and marketing arm, and Christian religious organization Members Church of God International (MCGI), its major blocktimer. DWAO-TV is one of very few NTSC-System M stations in the world that broadcast on Ultra High Frequency (UHF) Channel 37. In 2019, UNTV transferred its studios from the old UNTV Building at 907 EDSA Quezon City to La Verdad Christian College (LVCC) Caloocan Building, 351 EDSA, Brgy. Bagong Barrio West, Caloocan. UNTV transmitter is located at Emerald Hills, Sumulong Highway in Antipolo, Rizal. The 16-storey UNTV Broadcast Center, also referred to as The Millennial Tower and now called The Philippine Broadcast Hub along EDSA Philam is currently under construction to serve as its new headquarters.

UNTV is known for its broadcast of Ang Dating Daan (The Old Path), the longest-running religious program in the Philippines, hosted by radio and televangelist Bro. Eli Soriano of the Members Church of God International (MCGI).

UNTV's public service programs and free services are manned by BMPI chairman and CEO, Daniel Razon. Razon is also known as the co-host of Ang Dating Daan and MCGI's Overall Servant.

Network profile

PBC Blocktime 
UNTV Manila and Cebu were part of a blocktime programming agreement between Progressive Broadcasting Corporation (PBC) majority owned by Alfredo "Atom" Henares and Breakthrough and Milestones Productions International Inc. led by Daniel Razon. BMPI is the broadcast arm of Members Church of God International (MCGI) in the Philippines.

Assigned to PBC is the broadcast license, the radio frequency spectrum (UHF) necessary for broadcasting in key populated areas. The owners entrusted Razon with the network's programming and marketing through BMPI.

UNTV is referred to as "The Kasangbahay Network", a Filipino word which means "household", a group of people, often a family, who live together. It was introduced in 2007.

History

Original network, 2001 to 2004

In July 2001, the Progressive Broadcasting Corporation (PBC) owned by businessman Alfredo "Atom" Henares ventured into UHF television through UNTV 37, which initially branded as NUTV Channel 37. After almost a year of test broadcast, UNTV (pronounced as "un-TV", implying "the opposite of TV") was launched in May 2002 as a television counterpart to PBC's FM radio station NU 107 (DWNU 107.5 FM), airing rock and alternative rock music videos. NU 107 was a brainchild of Henares and radio veteran Mike N. Pedero. It carved a niche in the radio broadcast history as one of the first alternative radio stations that played artists who break new ground in music. In its early years on television, UNTV gained a cult following through comedy and reality show Strangebrew. The channel also aired the TV version of the iconic NU107 radio show "In the Raw"; as well as clips from the previous editions of the now-defunct NU Rock Awards; and NU 107 events such as Summer Shebang, NU 107 Pocket Concerts, and Party Monsters on the Loose.

Overhauled network, 2004 to present
In 2004, UNTV gradually reduced and eventually ceased airing rock music videos (The rock-oriented format would later be picked up in 2019 through RJ DigiTV's digital subchannel RJ Rock TV, formerly known as Rock of Manila TV, owned by the Rajah Broadcasting Network) after its blocktime slots were acquired by Tapatan, Inc., a multimedia and consultancy firm headed by veteran broadcaster Jay Sonza as chairman and CEO. Later, news and public affairs programs were introduced and Sonza became its station manager.

Henares also had a deal with MCGI for religious programming at night since 2003. Since then, UNTV started airing and eventually became the permanent home of the religious program Ang Dating Daan (The Old Path) after leaving GemCom Holdings-owned UHF TV network SBN 21 (which GemComm sold to Solar Entertainment Corporation in 2010 for P 368.8 million).

Later, the station was re-branded as "UN Television (UNTV)" (the letters were spelled out, and did not appear to have any meaning). The relaunch aims to introduce the station to a larger demographic range of audience. It comes with a new Station ID, own website, and new tagline "In Service to Humanity. Worldwide."

UNTV started from scratch with a one-room broadcast studio located at the AIC Gold Tower in Ortigas Center, Pasig.
 2004 marks UNTV's entry into satellite broadcasting using Agila 2 satellite then moved to ABS 5/ABS 3 satellite in late 2011, and later moved to Measat 3A satellite; as well as the start of its 24-hour broadcast through its official website.

In November 2005, the station became a household name after one of its cameraman captured an exclusive four-minute raw footage of a shooting incident in front of its studio in Ortigas which was aired in TV Patrol, the top-rated primetime newscast of ABS-CBN.

As it needs a larger space for its growing public service initiatives, the station transferred to Brgy. Damayang Lagi New Manila, Quezon City in 2006 and later to its own building at 907 Philam Homes along EDSA Quezon City in 2008 (until 2019).

BMPI era (2007 to present) 
Since the takeover in 2004, UNTV became a 24-hour free TV network (though it continues to sign-off on free TV every Monday mornings for regular transmitter maintenance; however, programming continues on pay TV and satellite) broadcasting not only religious programs of ADD, but also news and current affairs, public service, informative and entertainment programs. In 2007, UNTV was relaunched as a public service channel, a first in Philippine TV history.

In 2013, UNTV ceased using its old analog transmitter tower in Crestview Heights Subdivision, San Roque, Antipolo, Rizal (which is now acquired by Radio Philippines Network and Nine Media Corporation for digital TV broadcasts purposes), and began using its newly constructed tower located near Emerald Hills on Sumulong Highway, Antipolo, Rizal for a clearer and better signal reception and used to broadcast UNTV both in both analog and digital and radio station Wish 107.5.

From June 25 to 26, 2014, the network marked its tenth anniversary in the broadcast industry with a two-day UNTV Elderpowerment Expo and UNTV Rescue Summit held at the Philippine Trade Training Center (PTTC) and World Trade Center (WTC) both in Pasay; as well as the soft-relaunching of DWNU under management of UNTV-BMPI. On its last day, UNTV held the groundbreaking ceremony for the construction of UNTV Broadcast Center, a 16-storey building that will serve as its new headquarters strategically located along EDSA, in front of Ayala Land's Vertis North project and TriNoma mall, just a few meters away from its headquarters for more than a decade, the old UNTV building, the lot formerly occupied by Kamanggagawa Foundation's Transient Home.

On August 10, 2014, UNTV-BMPI formally relaunched DWNU 107.5 as 107.5 Wish FM with a free concert featuring OPM singers at the WTC and UNTV's newest station jingle entitled "Maaasahan Mo" sung by Shane Velasco and Beverly Caimen.

UNTV Life (2015 to 2016)
from August 25 to 26, as part of UNTV's 11th anniversary celebration, a two-day event was held including the opening of the basketball league of Philippine government agencies, the UNTV Cup Season 4 at the SM Mall of Asia Arena, Public Service Expo and the second UNTV Rescue Summit at the SMX Convention Center. On August 26, the unveiling of the new UNTV was held at the MOA Arena and it was officially rebranded as UNTV Life along with its upcoming shows and a new colorful 3D cube logo was introduced which was followed by a free concert courtesy of Wish 1075. On the following day, UNTV started airing with its new and refreshed look.

On May 18, 2016, President Benigno S. Aquino III signed Republic Act No. 10820 which renewed PBC's license for another 25 years. The law granted PBC a franchise to construct, install, operate, and maintain, for commercial purposes, radio broadcasting stations and television stations, including digital television system, with the corresponding facilities such as relay stations, throughout the Philippines.

UNTV News and Rescue/Public Service (2016 to present)
On July 18, 2016, UNTV Life underwent a major rebranding and rebranded to a global news and rescue company known as UNTV News and Rescue. The network meanwhile retained its long-time slogan, "Your Public Service Channel". After the refresh, its programs were classified into two programming blocks, UNTV News and Rescue and UNTV Public Service. The News and Rescue block is composed of newscasts such as Ito Ang Balita, UNTV Central News (C-News) and Why News and rescue-oriented program 911-UNTV. The Public Service block consists of public service and informative programs, including the network's newest public service program Serbisyong Bayanihan, religious programs like Ang Dating Daan and Itanong Mo Kay Soriano and entertainment and sports-oriented shows like ASOP Music Festival and UNTV Cup.

As it needs more space, while waiting for the completion of the UNTV Broadcast Center, the station transferred its studios and production facilities to La Verdad Christian College campus building in 351 Barangay Bagong Barrio West along EDSA in Caloocan.

2020s

COVID-19 pandemic 
As the world faces the global challenges brought about by the COVID-19 pandemic, on March 16 to July 31, 2020, UNTV launched its new slogan, "We serve the people, we give glory to God. / Diyos ang aming sandigan, serbisyo publiko ang aming pinahahalagahan."

During the Luzon-wide ECQ, UNTV pioneered purely-remote, live online shows in Philippine television. Its morning program Good Morning Kuya went live on March 17, 2020, with all of its hosts at home and online. This is duplicated in all of UNTV's news programs.

On April 8, 2020, UNTV aired the remote broadcast of Serbisyong Bayanihan hosted by UNTV-BMPI President and CEO Kuya Daniel Razon, live from a makeshift studio at his residence. The public service program caters to help those affected by the COVID-19 pandemic and educate the audience with updates about health protocols and announcements from authorities, including reports from UNTV's international correspondents. It also served to carry out small acts of kindness and opened direct access to government agencies and officials.

Also during the COVID-19 pandemic, UNTV launched its telemedicine platform for free medical consultations dubbed as UNTV Digital Clinic for outpatient, non-emergency cases.

On October 8, 2020, UNTV and Members Church of God International inaugurated a free service, quarantine facility in City of Malolos, province of Bulacan for probable and mild cases of coronavirus disease (COVID-19). The health facility has 32 individual isolation rooms manned by full time doctors, nurses and non-medical personnel to assist the patients.

New programs
In June 2020, UNTV aired the pilot broadcast of Hataw Balita Pilipinas (later Hataw Balita Probinsya) newscast with live reports from its provincial correspondents. It was followed by UNTV News Worldwide newscast filled with live reports from international correspondents.

In October 2020, veteran broadcaster Don Manolo Favis aired his new daily program Ito ang Inyong Lingkod, Don Manolo at UNTV Radyo La Verdad, simulcast at UNTV's digital television subchannel STV. Don Manalo is a long-time radio host at GMA Network's AM radio station DZBB and known for his long-running radio program This is Manolo and His GENIUS (God’s Eternal News in Universal Salvation) Family where international televangelist Bro. Eli Soriano, host of Ang Dating Daan religious program, became one of the show's regular panelists since the 80s.

On December 5, 2020, health-oriented program Healing Galing hosted by veteran broadcast journalist and naturopathy practitioner Dr. Edinell Calvario, aired its two-hour pilot live broadcast in UNTV with assigned timeslot every Saturday and Sunday mornings. Calvario is a pioneer DZMM Radyo Patrol 630 kHz field reporter, the radio arm of multimedia giant ABS-CBN. Healing Galing shares information and offers advice during its on-air show about naturopathy employing a wide array of herbal supplements with emphasis on diet and lifestyle changes. The move came after its former home TV5 Network, owned by PLDT's MediaQuest Holdings, abruptly cancelled airing Healing Galing show, including its simulcast over its radio arm Radyo5 92.3 News FM due to a programming revamp of TV5 and Radyo5 under the leadership of TV5/Cignal President and CEO Robert Galang.

Digital transition

Digital terrestrial television
UNTV is currently testing Japan's Integrated Service Digital Broadcasting-Terrestrial (ISDB-T), the sole digital television (DTV) standard in the Philippines for its transition from analog to digital broadcast. During its ninth anniversary celebration in 2013, Daniel Razon announced the network's ongoing transition from analog to digital broadcast. The activity includes upgrading of technical equipment and studio facilities.

After a year, UNTV began its test broadcast in Metro Manila using its new digital transmitter in Antipolo. On October 2, 2014, UNTV began its simulcast test broadcast on UHF channel 38 (617.143 MHz) along with its analog broadcast on UHF channel 37. It has two standard definition (SD) channels and one 1seg or “oneseg” channel. 1seg is the common name of DTV service specifically for mobile phone devices. UNTV multi-channel line-up also includes one high definition (HD) channel called “ADDTV” or Ang Dating Daan TV showing purely religious programs. Its digital broadcast can be received in Metro Manila and nearby provinces like Bulacan, Pampanga, Cavite and Rizal, using ISDB-T set top boxes including LED TV sets and mobile devices with built-in ISDB-T tuners. In a DTV signal test conducted by Philippine mobile phone brand Starmobile last April 2015, UNTV was present in eight out of 14 locations in Metro Manila with decent signal strength of three up to the maximum of four signal bars.

In April 2016, Anywave Communication Technologies Co. Ltd. announced that UNTV tapped Anywave for its implementation of analog and digital transmitters. Anywave is a manufacturer of television and radio transmission equipment with headquarters in Illinois, United States.

In 2018, BMPI launched Social TV (STV) subchannel on digital terrestrial television airing entertainment and educational videos from social media contributors and vloggers. In 2020, it was discontinued and replaced by the UNTV's main channel feed at 1080p resolution.

News and current affairs
UNTV News and Current Affairs (also known as UNTV News) is the news division of UNTV News and Rescue. The organization is responsible for the daily news and information gathering for its news programs. It serves UNTV, UNTV Radio La Verdad 1350 kHz and UNTV News website.

The division operates at UNTV Building in Quezon City and has news bureaus in various provinces and abroad. It has news correspondents and stringers in North America, South America, Europe, Asia Oceania and the Middle East.

Currently, it is headed by former GMA News reporter Michael Fajatin, while the North America News Bureau Chief is Joselito Mallari. UNTV Radio La Verdad 1350 kHz, UNTV's flagship AM radio station is headed by station manager Annie Rentoy.

All newscasts (except Why News which is delivered in English) are presented in the Filipino vernacular. In 2016, UNTV reporters started delivering pre-recorded reports in different languages. Province-based reporters delivered the news in Filipino or in their native dialects, while foreign-based correspondents using in English or any foreign languages in their reports. Second-language subtitles were also introduced for the benefit of hearing-impaired viewers (English subtitles on all newscasts for the benefit of international viewers, but may add Filipino subtitles for regional and international reports).

News and rescue team
In July 2010, Daniel Razon launched an advocacy "Tulong Muna Bago Balita" (English: Lifelines Before Headlines; lit: Rescue First, Report Later). UNTV correspondents are not pressured to break or report news exclusives but encourages media practitioners to prioritize saving lives as part of their profession. UNTV News correspondents were sent to an emergency response training (ERT) course. They were trained by the Search and Rescue Unit Foundation, Inc. (SARUF), a recognized army rescue unit in the Philippines, to be rescuers, from first-aid applications to technical search and rescue operations. After passing the ERT, the news team was renamed UNTV News and Rescue Team. On November 28, 2010, the network launched 15 news and rescue mobile units and later, a News and Rescue Command Center at the UNTV Building. The team are equipped with all-terrain/amphibian vehicles and rescue trucks for their operations. The station also launched the UNTV Fire Brigade after acquiring new firetrucks.

In August 2015, an underwater rescue team and hundreds of new rescuers were introduced. A new hotline for emergency situations, 911-UNTV (911-8688), was also launched. In 2016, news anchors and program hosts of the network also joined the rescue training.

Drone journalism
In 2013, UNTV marked another first in Philippine TV news landscape as the network acquired DJI Phantom aerial drones for their live news reporting. In November 2013, drones were used by UNTV for its coverage of the Typhoon Haiyan aftermath in Tacloban, Leyte. Currently, drones are used by the network in reporting traffic. The UNTV drone coverages set the standards for other channels to follow.

Notable on-air personalities
 Bro. Eli Soriano
 Kuya Daniel Razon
 Don Manolo Favis
 Toni Rose Gayda
 Ayra Mariano
 Joshua Dionisio

BMPI artists
 The Wishfuls
 Princess Sevillena
 Ace Bartolome
 Carmela Ariola
 Louie Ann Culala
 Kimberly Baluzo
 Rhea Basco
 Plethora
 The Bradz
 Lucky Robles
 Leah Patricio

Public service
All these public services are located at their studio at EDSA-Philam. The daily free medical consultations were done at 164 Congressional Avenue, Barangay Bahay-Toro, Quezon City.
911-UNTV (8688): News and Rescue in Metro Manila and in key cities around the Philippines
UNTV Digital Clinic (launched during COVID-19 pandemic)
MCGI-UNTV Health Facility in City of Malolos, Bulacan (COVID-19 quarantine facility)
Serbisyong Bayanihan
Cleanup Drives
MCGI Pharmacy (Former Clinic ni Kuya) (Free Clinic)
Job Fair ni Kuya
MCGI Law Center (Former Law Center ni Kuya)(Free Legal Counseling)
Libreng Sakay (Free One-Ride Bus Ride)
Manibela Academy
Munting Pangarap TV program (Simple Wish)
Transient Home
Tulong Muna Bago Balita (Rescue First, Report Later)
UNTV Fire Brigade
Radyo La Verdad Mobile Radio Booth
Wish 107.5 Bus

Accolades

Nominations
Nominated, Best TV Station (PMPC Star Awards for TV 2006–2016)
Nominated, Best TV Station in Metro Manila (KBP Golden Dove Awards 2005–2011)

Programming

UNTV's well-balanced program lineup consists of news and public service programs, religious programs, entertainment and informative programs, talk shows, sports shows, and educational programs. It also launched a regular community prayer aimed at bringing the prayerful lifestyle using broadcast media.
The programs shown on the network are produced by BMPI. Meanwhile, religious programs are produced by the Members Church of God International.

Aside from these, UNTV also acts as a news channel. In case of developing stories, and even important or scheduled live coverage, UNTV pre-empts its regularly scheduled programming to give way for the developing news stories and/or important coverage of a news story as it happens. Regular scheduled programming resume once the coverage of an important event has ended.

Television stations

Analog stations

Digital stations
UNTV is currently testing Japan's Integrated Service Digital Broadcasting - Terrestrial (ISDB-T), the sole digital television (DTV) standard in the Philippines for its transition from analog to digital broadcast. On October 2, 2014, UNTV began its simulcast test broadcast on UHF Channel 38 (617.143 MHz) with three high definition (HD) channel and one 1seg channel. UNTV's digital broadcast can be received in Metro Manila and nearby provinces using ISDB-T set top boxes, including LED TV sets and mobile devices with built-in ISDB-T tuners. In a DTV signal test conducted by Philippine mobile phone brand Starmobile last April 2015, UNTV was present in eight out of 14 locations in Metro Manila with decent signal strength of three up to the maximum of four signal bars.

Digital channel line-up

Satellite broadcast
UNTV can be received via satellite in the Philippines and other countries in Asia, Australia, Middle East, Europe and Africa.

Pay television

Internet streaming
UNTV can be received via online streaming by encoding the network's streaming link URL in the VLC Media Player installed on personal computers and mobile devices.

Mobile application
In 2013, BMPI launched the UNTV Mobile App for Apple iOS and Google Android mobile and tablet devices. In 2016, it was made available for Windows Mobile phones. By downloading the mobile application, users with stable internet connection will be able to watch the broadcast feed of UNTV News and Rescue and listen to Radio La Verdad 1350 kHz for free.

References

External links

Breakthrough and Milestones Productions International

Members Church of God International
Progressive Broadcasting Corporation
Television stations in Metro Manila
Television channels and stations established in 2001
Digital television stations in the Philippines
Religious television stations in the Philippines